Guli (also Romanized as Gūlī; also known as Golī and Kūlī) is a village in Chaharduli Rural District, Keshavarz District, Shahin Dezh County, West Azerbaijan Province, Iran. At the 2006 census, its population was 34, in 7 families.

References 

Populated places in Shahin Dezh County